,  is a Japanese surname. notable people with the surname include:

, Japanese swimmer
, Japanese director and screenwriter 
, Japanese volleyball player
, Japanese voice actor
Yoshi Obayashi, Japanese-born American comedian

Fictional characters
Keiko Obayashi, the main character of the 2003 comedy film Drugstore Girl
, a character from Strike Witches

Japanese-language surnames